Gaoloujin station is a subway station on Line 7 of the Beijing Subway, located in Gaoloujin Village, Liyuan Town in Tongzhou District. It has a double island platform.

Station Layout 
The station has underground dual-island platforms with a track in the center.

Exits 
There are 4 exits, lettered A, B, C, and D. All exits are accessible.

References

Beijing Subway stations in Tongzhou District
Railway stations in China opened in 2019